Henry Wells Tracy (September 24, 1807 – April 11, 1886) was an Independent Republican member of the U.S. House of Representatives from Pennsylvania.

Henry W. Tracy was born in Ulster Township, Pennsylvania. He attended the Angelica Seminary in Allegany County, New York. He studied law, engaged in mercantile pursuits and as a road contractor in Standing Stone, Pennsylvania, Havre de Grace, Maryland, and Towanda, Pennsylvania. He was a delegate to the 1860 Republican National Convention. He was a member of the Pennsylvania House of Representatives in 1861 and 1862.

Tracy was elected as an Independent Republican to the Thirty-eighth Congress. He served as collector of the port of Philadelphia in 1866. He resumed mercantile pursuits and died at Standing Stone in 1886, aged 78. He was interred in the Brick Church Cemetery in Wysox, Pennsylvania.

Sources

The Political Graveyard

Members of the United States House of Representatives from Pennsylvania
Members of the Pennsylvania House of Representatives
People from Bradford County, Pennsylvania
1807 births
1886 deaths
Pennsylvania Republicans
Pennsylvania Independents
Independent Republican members of the United States House of Representatives
19th-century American politicians